La Homa is a census-designated place (CDP) in Hidalgo County, Texas. The population was 11,985 at the 2010 United States Census. It is part of the McAllen–Edinburg–Mission Metropolitan Statistical Area.

Geography
La Homa is located at  (26.275973, -98.358892).

Demographics
As of the census of 2010, there were 11,985 people, 2,381 households, and 2,211 families residing in the CDP. The population density was 1,521.6 people per square mile (587.2/km2). There were 2,856 housing units at an average density of 416.5/sq mi (160.7/km2). The racial makeup of the CDP was 87.89% White, 0.12% African American, 0.02% Native American, 0.07% Asian, 11.46% from other races, and 0.44% from two or more races. Hispanic or Latino of any race were 97.73% of the population.

There were 2,381 households, out of which 67.0% had children under the age of 18 living with them, 75.7% were married couples living together, 13.3% had a female householder with no husband present, and 7.1% were non-families. 6.0% of all households were made up of individuals, and 2.3% had someone living alone who was 65 years of age or older. The average household size was 4.37 and the average family size was 4.52.

In the CDP, the population was spread out, with 43.2% under the age of 18, 11.9% from 18 to 24, 29.0% from 25 to 44, 11.7% from 45 to 64, and 4.2% who were 65 years of age or older. The median age was 22 years. For every 100 females, there were 99.6 males. For every 100 females age 18 and over, there were 95.3 males.

The median income for a household in the CDP was $16,887, and the median income for a family was $17,707. Males had a median income of $15,295 versus $13,897 for females. The per capita income for the CDP was $5,180. About 53.8% of families and 57.4% of the population were below the poverty line, including 63.9% of those under age 18 and 62.2% of those age 65 or over.

Education
La Homa is served by the La Joya Independent School District.

Zoned schools include:
 Elementary: Lloyd Bentsen, Kika de la Garza, Henry B. González, Américo Paredes, Patricio Pérez, and E. B. Reyna
 Middle: I. Garcia, Memorial, J. D. Salinas, and Domingo Treviño
 Juarez-Lincoln High School and Palmview High School

In addition, South Texas Independent School District operates magnet schools that serve the community.

References

Census-designated places in Hidalgo County, Texas
Census-designated places in Texas